Finance Research Letters is a bimonthly peer-reviewed academic journal covering research on all areas of finance that was established in 2004. As a letters journal, the length of manuscripts published is limited to 2,500 words. It is a member of the "Elsevier Finance Ecosystem", a grouping of 10 academic finance journals.

Reception
According to the Journal Citation Reports, the journal has a 2021 impact factor of 9.846, ranking it first out of 111 journals in the category "Business, Finance"..

See also
Journal of Finance
Journal of Financial Economics
Review of Financial Studies

References

External links

Elsevier academic journals
English-language journals
Finance journals
Publications established in 2004
Bimonthly journals